Statistics of Ekstraklasa for the 1985–86 season.

Overview
It was contested by 16 teams, and Górnik Zabrze won the championship.

League table

Results

Top goalscorers

References

External links
 Poland – List of final tables at RSSSF 

Ekstraklasa seasons
1985–86 in Polish football
Pol